Sher Shah may refer to:

People 
 Sher Shah Suri (1486–1545), founder of the Suri dynasty
Sher Shah (VC) (1917–1945), British Indian Army soldier and Victoria Cross recipient
Shershah Syed, Pakistani physician

Places

India 
Sher Shah Suri Mosque, mosque in Patna, Bihar, India
Tomb of Sher Shah Suri, tomb of Sher Shah Suri in Sasaram, Bihar, India
Sher Shah Suri Marg, another name for some of the Indian parts of the Grand Trunk Road
Shershahabad, another name for Purana Qila in Delhi, India

Pakistan 
Sher Shah (Karachi), neighbourhood of Kiamari Town, Karachi, Pakistan
 Sher Shah Bridge, a flyover in the neighborhood
 Sher Shah, Multan, town in Multan District, Pakistan

Others 

 Shershah College of Engineering, Sasaram, Bihar, India
 Shershaah, 2021 Indian war film by Vishnuvardhan
 Shershahabadia, an Indian Muslim community
 Tarikh-i-Sher Shahi, a chronicle of the rule of Sher Shah Suri
 Shershah Suri, Indian television show about Sher Shah Suri, broadcast by Doordarshan

See also 

 Sher Khan (disambiguation)